Matthew Aaron Good (born February 11, 1984) is an American musician, singer and record producer. He is best known for being the lead guitarist, lead vocalist and the only constant member of the post-hardcore band From First to Last from its conception in 1999 until now. He was formerly the guitarist of grindcore band The Color of Violence, which featured future From First to Last members Travis Richter, Derek Bloom, and Joey Antillon. He joined Chiodos vocalist Craig Owens' band, D.R.U.G.S., eventually moving on to produce music under the name Kit Fysto with friend AJ Calderon. He currently owns and operates a music recording studio in Tempe, Arizona called Good Sounds and plays guitar in From First to Last. He also produced Asking Alexandria's self titled album, which was released on 15 December 2017.

Musical career

The Color of Violence and From First to Last (2002–2010, 2013–Present) 
Good was originally in grindcore outfit The Color of Violence, then known as Skeleton Slaughter vs. Fetus Destroyer. The band had started as a full-time project, but Good, along with fellow members Travis Richter, Derek Bloom, and Joey Antillon, decided to move on to form From First to Last.

From First to Last (then known as simply First Too Last) was founded by guitarist-vocalist Travis Richter and Good. The group, then having a rotating line-up, released their debut EP, Aesthetic, on Four Leaf Recordings in New York. Good and Bloom were the only original members to be on all of the band's releases. They were featured on all four of the band's full-length albums and went on all of their tours.

Destroy Rebuild Until God Shows (D.R.U.G.S.) (2010–2012) 
After being kicked out of Chiodos in late 2009, Craig Owens had started saying that he was putting a new band together, which was unnamed at the time. Owens later revealed the name of the new band was D.R.U.G.S., which is an acronym for Destroy Rebuild Until God Shows. Owens started to reveal band members one by one through video blogs. By the time the last member was announced, the band consisted of Craig Owens as the lead vocalist, Matt Good as a guitarist and vocalist, Nick Martin also as a guitarist and vocalist, Adam Russell as bassist and Aaron Stern as the drummer. The band entered the recording studio on August 25, 2010, and finished recording the album on October 21 of the same year. The band then went on their first headlining tour Rise from the Ashes Tour, supported by Eyes Set To Kill and New Medicine, taking place between December 4–19, 2010. The band announced that the album would be titled D.R.U.G.S. with a release date of February 22, 2011.

Kit Fysto and Rumors Surrounding New D.R.U.G.S. Project (2012–2013) 
While in D.R.U.G.S., Matt Good and friend AJ Calderon created a side project named "juiceb0x". The two produced a few Dubstep/Electronica remixes under that name. Later, however, they changed their name from "juiceb0x" to Kit Fysto, due to a copyright infringement issue. After Matt Good and two other band members left D.R.U.G.S., Kit Fysto became Matt Good and AJ Calderon's full-time project. The two are scheduled to play their first live show together June 22, 2012 at The Electric Glow Festival in Allentown, Pennsylvania. The two have an official YouTube channel, KitFystoOfficial, which only has one video due to the fact that Matt Good and AJ Calderon have a newfound addiction to Diablo III.

Matt Good and all the other former members of Destroy Rebuild Until God Shows excluding Craig Owens who returned to Chiodos, discussed forming a new unnamed project together, but due to Good and the other two ex-members of D.R.U.G.S having to sign a contract when they first joined the band stating that they could not be a band without Owens, they could not carry on with this new project.

From First to Last Reunion (2013–Present) 
In November 2013, it was announced that FFTL would be reuniting. The lineup would consist of Good, Travis Richter, Derek Bloom and Matt Manning. Bloom was unable to take part in the reunion, so Good recruited Taylor Larson on guitar, Spencer Sotelo of Periphery on vocals, and Ernie Slenkovich on drums. FFTL's Kickstarter project was successfully funded in late 2013. Their original goal was to write and record an EP, but they ultimately decided to release an LP. That full-length album, titled "Dead Trees," was released in April 2015 under Sumerian Records. FFTL played their first reunion show with Black Veil Brides on Halloween night of 2014 at the Marquee Theater in Tempe, Arizona. They went on to complete a short West coast U.S. tour in December 2014.

Kill It With Fire (2016) 
In October 2016, Matt announced via Twitter that he is involved in a new band called Kill It With Fire.  The band includes Matt Good on vocals and guitar, along with Ben Bruce from Asking Alexandria on guitar, and Zack Hansen from The Word Alive on bass,(drummer TBA).  Matt Good stated "It's gonna be pretty pop punk, but not too pop punk.  Just the right amount".  Matt also stated the record will probably be done by Christmas. However, all tweets regarding the project has since been deleted and has not been mentioned since, placing the status of project in unknown.

Good Sounds and Music Production 
Aside from performing, Good runs a recording studio in Tempe, Arizona called Good Sounds where he produces, mixes, and masters full-length albums and EPs. He works closely with K&Z Entertainment and has many releases to his name. He has worked with many big bands such as Asking Alexandria, The Word Alive, and Attila.

Discography 

with From First to Last

with Destroy Rebuild Until God Shows (D.R.U.G.S.)

as a producer

References 

1984 births
Place of birth missing (living people)
Living people
American rock guitarists
American male guitarists
21st-century American guitarists
21st-century American male musicians
Destroy Rebuild Until God Shows members
From First to Last members
The Color of Violence members